Marple railway station in Marple, Greater Manchester, England, is on the Hope Valley Line  south-east of Manchester Piccadilly. The station, opened in 1865 by the Manchester, Sheffield and Lincolnshire Railway, was demolished and rebuilt in 1970. It is managed and served by Northern Trains, who provide two trains per hour in each direction.

The other station in Marple is Rose Hill Marple, on a spur of the Hope Valley Line which, until 1970, continued towards Macclesfield.

Description

The station is to the east of Marple, near Marple Bridge and close to Brabyns Park and the Peak Forest Canal. The A626 runs over a bridge next to the station and provides access to it. The next station towards Piccadilly is Romiley and the next towards Sheffield is Strines.

The ticket office is staffed during the day; there are benches, toilets and a waiting room on the platform. Passenger information systems include dot-matrix displays and an automated public-address system announce approaching services. Timetable information posters are provided and help points allow passengers to contact railway staff.

In 2014/15, 455,470 entries and exits were recorded at the station, making it the sixth busiest within Stockport and the busiest on the Hope Valley Line after Manchester Piccadilly and Sheffield. This is a decrease from 475,192 in 2013/14, the first since 2009/10.

Services

All services at Marple are operated by Northern Trains using diesel multiple units, as the line is not electrified. The service uses a mixture of Class 150 and, since 2020, Class 195 units.

When Arriva UK Trains took over the Northern franchise in April 2016, services were primarily run by Class 142 Pacer trains. A commitment was made for all Pacers to be replaced with alternative trains by 2020, due to their lack of assessibility. The final Pacer train stopped at the station on 6 March 2020 on a service from Sheffield.
 
The station is well served by trains to and from Manchester Piccadilly from Monday to Saturday; there are two services per hour during the daytime, reducing to hourly in the evening. There are two services per hour eastbound to New Mills Central, with one of these continuing along the Hope Valley to Sheffield; this  reduces to hourly in the evenings. One peak hour service also originates here. On Sundays there is a two-hourly service in the morning and evening in each direction, increasing to hourly in the afternoons.

Tickets to and from Rose Hill Marple station are valid on board all Manchester Piccadilly bound trains from Marple station.

History

Marple railway station was built by the Manchester, Sheffield and Lincolnshire Railway (MS&LR) on the extension of its Hyde branch to New Mills, opening to the public on 1 July 1865.

The line was built in conjunction with the Midland Railway's extension of its line to Millers Dale, thus it was also used by the latter's trains from London to Manchester Store Street (later called London Road, now Piccadilly). Until the Midland moved to Manchester Central, in 1880, as a member of the Cheshire Lines Committee, Marple was where carriages for Liverpool would be attached or detached.

At the time it had extensive station buildings, the Midland waiting room having upholstered seats and a coal fire in an attractive fireplace for cold winter days. It was rebuilt in 1970 and the MS&L facilities were demolished, with new brick buildings replacing the Midland's offices.

Alongside the viaduct is the Marple Aqueduct, which carries the Peak Forest Canal over the River Goyt.

Agatha Christie's Miss Marple
In 1902, when Agatha Christie was twelve, her sister Margaret married James Watts and they lived at Abney Hall, Cheadle. Christie, encouraged by Watts to write, was a frequent visitor to Abney Hall from a young age into adulthood. The area around the hall and Cheadle inspired many settings within her books. From her home in Devon, Christie often used the railway to travel there, connecting from the Midland Main Line from London St Pancras onto the Hope Valley Line, and passing through Marple. It is theorised that a train was delayed there for long enough for the station sign to stick in her mind, to resurface in 1932 at the publication of the first novel featuring Jane Marple. However, at a 2015 event to celebrate the station's 150th anniversary, Christie's grandson produced a letter she had written to a fan that appears to prove that the name was inspired by a sale at Marple Hall during a visit to her sister at Abney Hall.

Future
As part of Manchester's Transport Innovation Fund bid in 2008, which would see a weekday peak time congestion charge introduced on roads into the city centre in order for a £3bn injection into the region's public transport, Marple would have seen an increase to four services per hour in both directions throughout the day to Manchester Piccadilly. The line would have effectively been run as a metro-style operation, offering users of Marple and other stations along the route the ease of showing up without needing to know exact departure times. However, no "station improvements" were planned, despite the comparatively high usage of this suburban station. The rejection of the TIF plans in a public referendum in December 2008 (by a 4 to 1 majority) led to the plans being abandoned in April 2010.

References

External links

Railway stations in the Metropolitan Borough of Stockport
DfT Category D stations
Former Great Central and Midland Joint Railway stations
Railway stations in Great Britain opened in 1865
Northern franchise railway stations
1865 establishments in England
Marple, Greater Manchester